Jacob Thomas VC (February 1833 – 3 March 1911) was a Welsh recipient of the Victoria Cross, the highest and most prestigious award for gallantry in the face of the enemy that can be awarded to British and Commonwealth forces.

Details
Thomas was about 24 years old, and a bombardier in the Bengal Artillery, Bengal Army during the Indian Mutiny when the following deed took place on 27 September 1857 at the Siege of Lucknow, British India for which he was awarded the VC:

Further information
He later achieved the rank of quartermaster-sergeant. He was born in Llanwinio near Carmarthen and died near  Darjeeling aged 77.

The medal
His Victoria Cross is displayed at the Royal Artillery Museum, Woolwich, England.

References

Monuments to Courage (David Harvey, 1999)
The Register of the Victoria Cross (This England, 1997)

1833 births
1911 deaths
British recipients of the Victoria Cross
Indian Rebellion of 1857 recipients of the Victoria Cross
People from Carmarthenshire
Bengal Artillery soldiers
Welsh recipients of the Victoria Cross
Military personnel from Carmarthenshire
Burials in India